The Frog Prince, Continued by Jon Scieszka, illustrated by  Steve Johnson, is a picture book parody "sequel" to the tale of The Frog Prince, in which a princess kisses a frog which then turns into a prince. It was first published in 1991.

Plot
Instead of living happily ever after, issues ensue on both sides. The princess wants the prince to go do something heroic instead of lying around the castle catching flies all day (he's now human but retains some froggy habits). The prince wishes she wouldn't nag him and thinks he was happier back at his lily pad. Eventually he gets fed up and runs away.

The prince encounters three witches on his wanderings and asks each to turn him back into a frog, so he can live happily ever after. The first witch thinks he is looking for Sleeping Beauty. The second witch offers him a poisoned apple. The third lives in a gingerbread house, appears to know Hansel and Gretel, and invites the prince in for dinner. The prince wisely flees from these witches, but finds himself lost in the forest with night falling.

At last, he happens upon a fairy godmother, who is on her way to see a girl about a ball, but who obligingly turns him into a carriage (her repertoire is limited). As he sits in the forest and realizes just how good he had it with the princess, he thinks he'll never get home again. Fortunately, the fairy godmother's magic wears off at (not surprisingly) midnight, the prince turns back into a prince, and he runs home to his princess. When she tells him how much she loves him and was worried about him, the prince kisses the princess, and their troubles are resolved with a different happy ending: they are both transformed into frogs.

1991 children's books
American children's books
American picture books
Fairy tale parodies
The Frog Prince
Sequel books
English-language books
Picture books based on fairy tales
Works based on Grimms' Fairy Tales
Books about frogs
Fiction about shapeshifting
Viking Press books